Benjamin Francis Ford (May 12, 1901 – June 20, 1986), known professionally as The Duke of Paducah, was an American country comedian, radio host and banjo player popular from the 1940s to the 1960s.

Ford was born in De Soto, Missouri, and was raised in Little Rock, Arkansas. He had only a third-grade education, so he joked that he came from the "university of hard knocks". He enlisted in the U.S. Navy in 1918. During his Navy service he learned to play the banjo and earned his nickname Whitey Ford because of his blond hair. After his discharge in 1922, he joined McGinty's Oklahoma Cowboy Band, a Dixieland jazz group, as a banjo player. The group later changed its name to Otto Gray and his Oklahoma Cowboys and appeared in a few Hollywood film shorts. In 1929, Ford made his debut on WLS-AM in Chicago, Illinois. A serious man off stage, he lit up on screen.

In the early 1930s, while working at KWK in St. Louis, Ford took the stage name The Duke of Paducah. In 1937, he founded the Renfro Valley Barn Dance with Red Foley and John Lair. More radio work followed when he became a regular on Plantation Party, an NBC Radio show in Cincinnati and Chicago. From 1942–1959, Ford was a regular on the Grand Ole Opry where he became a member.  He also hosted several popular radio shows broadcast nationally. In the mid-1950s, Ford toured with a troupe he called the Rock and Roll Revue. On several occasions, he shared a bill with Elvis Presley. In 1958, he began hosting an early morning television show, Country Junction, on WLAC-TV in Nashville, which he hosted for several years, being succeeded by disc jockey Eddie Hill.

Ford ended his act with his tagline: "I'm goin' back to the wagon, boys, these shoes are killin' me." He was elected to the Country Music Hall of Fame in February 1986.

Notes

References
Country Music Hall of Fame profile
Answers.com
Traditional Country Music Radio
Elvis Club
Boards Radio

1901 births
1986 deaths
People from De Soto, Missouri
American male comedians
Grand Ole Opry members
American radio personalities
American television personalities
Country Music Hall of Fame inductees
Starday Records artists
20th-century American singers
Comedians from Missouri
20th-century American comedians